Morning Rises is the fifth studio album from contemporary Christian musician Aaron Shust. It was released on July 16, 2013, by Centricity Music, and it was produced by Ed Cash. The album got positive critical reception from music critics, and it saw commercial success.

Background
The album was released on July 16, 2013, by Centricity Music, which it was produced by Ed Cash, and it was the fifth studio album for Shust's career.

Critical reception
{{Album ratings
 | rev1 = About.com
 | rev1score = 
 | rev2 = Alpha Omega News
 | rev2score = A
 | rev3 = CCM Magazine
 | rev3score = <ref name=ccm>{{cite web |url=http://www.ccmmagazine.com/magazine/2013/jul/60.htm |title=Aaron Shust: Morning Rises (Centricity) |last=Conner |first=Matt |date=July 1, 2013 |work=CCM Magazine |accessdate=July 12, 2013 |page=61 |url-status=dead |archiveurl=https://archive.today/20130629095353/http://www.ccmmagazine.com/magazine/2013/jul/60.htm |archivedate=June 29, 2013 }}</ref>
 | rev4 = Christian Music Review
 | rev4score = 
 | rev5 = CM Addict
 | rev5score = 
 | rev6 = Cross Rhythms
 | rev6score = 
 | rev7 = Indie Vision Music
 | rev7score = 
 | rev8 = Jesus Freak Hideout
 | rev8score = 
 | rev9 = New Release Tuesday
 | rev9score = 
 | rev10 = The Phantom Tollbooth
 | rev10score = 
 | rev11 = Worship Leader | rev11score = 
}}Morning Rises garnered positive reception from music critics.

At Alpha Omega News, Ken Weigman stated that he "benefited from the encouragement already", and he is "sure that it will be an ongoing experience with 'Morning Rises.'" At Worship Leader, Greg Wallace stated that "Aaron Shust has come back bearing a project that’s both powerful and accessible, brimming with poetry and hope." About.com's Kim Jones stated that "it's pretty much a guarantee that at least one or two songs will go on to become "worship standards" in the church." At New Release Tuesday, Dawn Teresa said that "the result is a more personal, energetic sound which captures his reinvigorated spirit." At Cross Rhythms, Tony Cummings called this yet "Another outstanding album from the consistent Mr Shust."

Andrew Funderburk of CM Addict wrote that "it is obvious this comes from a true heart of worship and not just trying to write lyrics in order to sell another record", and he called it "simply passionate!" At Christian Music Review, Laura Chambers noted that "If you're going through a crisis of faith, a dry spell, or even if you’re where you ought to be, Morning Rises is an affirming, life giving reminder of God’s provision for us." Michael Dalton at The Phantom Tollbooth wrote that "Morning Rises is fresh evidence that there is more to Shust then 'My Savior My God,'" and felt that "everything here as much and more than that celebrated song."

At CCM Magazine, Matt Conner felt that the album "focused on the greater theme of God's faithfulness, Aaron Shust offers a message of hope to his fans on Morning Rises." Jonathan Andre of Indie Vision Music called the release "enjoyable and inspired". Bert Gangl of The Phantom Tollbooth wrote that "Rises isn't bad by any stretch of the imagination", but cautioned that some listeners "are liable to be disappointed", so he said that some buyers might "cherry pick" songs to download. In addition, Gangl wrote for Jesus Freak Hideout that "Morning Rises comes across as a far more unified and coherent whole."

Commercial performance
For the Billboard charting week of August 3, 2013, Morning Rises'' was the No. 14 most sold album in Christian market via the Christian Albums charting.

Track listing

Personnel 
 Aaron Shust – lead vocals, backing vocals, acoustic piano, acoustic guitar
 Adrian Disch – keyboards 
 Ed Cash – keyboards, programming, acoustic guitar, backing vocals 
 Jonathan Smith – keyboards, programming 
 Scott Cash – programming, backing vocals 
 Cody Norris – programming, acoustic guitar, backing vocals 
 Nathan Bedingfield – electric guitars
 Chris Lacorte – electric guitars 
 Duffy – bass 
 Brandon Coker – drums 
 Jon Bowen – backing vocals 
 Jennifer Allen, Dan Buettner, John Frost, Chris Hauser, Jackie Howard, Chris Kelly, Kris Love, Marshall Macari, Mike Perry, Joe Polek, Mike Prendergast, Bill Ronning, Theresa Rose, Keith Stevens, Matt Stockman and Steve Swanson – group vocals on "No One Higher"

Production 
 Ed Cash – producer, engineer 
 Jonathan Smith – additional production on "The One"
 John Mays – executive producer 
 Scott Cash – assistant engineer
 Cody Norris – assistant engineer
 Sean Moffitt – mixing 
 Warren David – mix assistant 
 Bob Boyd – mastering at Ambient Digital (Houston, Texas)
 Katie Moore – art direction, design 
 Amanda Coker – studio photography 
 Eaglemont Entertainment – management

Charts

References 

2013 albums
Aaron Shust albums
Centricity Music albums